David Thomas (born June 18, 1974 in Sangre Grande) is a male beach volleyball player from Trinidad and Tobago.
David made history along with Kevin Edwards, becoming the first caribbean team playing in the Swatch FIVB World Tour, the Montreal Open.

Playing with the same partner, he earned the 10th place at the Central American and Caribbean Games beach volleyball tournament.

He played in the men's competition at the NORCECA Beach Volleyball Circuit 2009 in Guatemala partnering with Kevin Rivers when Christian Francois withdrew from the competition. They finished in the 12th place.

References

External Links 
 
 

1974 births
Living people
Trinidad and Tobago beach volleyball players
Men's beach volleyball players
Competitors at the 2006 Central American and Caribbean Games